Remains is a compilation album from Alkaline Trio.

Contents
The album is a collection of 22 tracks that the band has recorded for various compilations, EPs, B-sides and international releases. The disc also includes three new live tracks from a 2006 concert at Avalon in Los Angeles. Vocalist/guitarist, Matt Skiba describes the collection as "an unintentional sort of bookend for our career thus far." A DVD that includes 45 minutes of material, including all the band's videos from From Here to Infirmary, Good Mourning, and Crimson, accompanies the disc. Included is exclusive B-roll and behind-the-scenes footage from the band's live shows.

Release and reception

On November 6, 2006, Remains was announced for release. The band explained: "...in the midst of the torrent of recording albums and touring to support them -- we will book into a studio and record some more... These truly are the remains of the last half-decade." On December 31, the band posted an e-card, which contained "We Can Never Break Up" and "Hell Yes" available for streaming. It was released on January 31, 2007, through Vagrant. On February 6, a music video was released for "Warbrain". The video includes live footage of the band from a New Year's Eve show. The album peaked at #64 on Billboard 200. By August 2008, the album sold 60,000 copies. A vinyl repressing of the album was released through Newbury Comics on February 3, 2023, and was limited to 500 copies.

Track listing
 "Hell Yes" - 3:49
 "My Standard Break from Life" - 2:34
 "Dead End Road" - 3:08
 "Metro" - 3:41
 "Jaked on Green Beers" - 3:27
 "Queen of Pain" - 3:56
 "While You're Waiting" - 4:06
 "Rooftops" - 2:15
 "Old School Reasons" - 2:51
 "Warbrain" - 2:28
 "Fine Without You" - 3:15
 "Hating Every Minute" - 3:03
 "Dead and Broken" - 2:09
 "Sadie" - 4:38
 "If You Had a Bad Time" - 3:38
 "Wait for the Blackout" - 3:28
 "We Can Never Break Up" - 3:10
 "Don't Say You Won't" - 2:21
 "Buried" - 3:16
 "Dethbed" (Live) - 3:12
 "My Standard Break from Life" (Live Acoustic) - 2:42
 "I'm Dying Tomorrow" (Live) - 2:31

Origins of tracks

Tracks 1-2 are from the Hell Yes EP. Track 1 was also used as a b-side. Track 2 was also featured on the Plea for Peace compilation album.  both were also available as UK bonus tracks on From Here to Infirmary, although track 2 is named "Standard Break".
Track 3 is from the compilation Living Tomorrow Today: A Benefit for Ty Cambra.  It also appeared as a UK bonus track on Good Mourning.
Track 4 is a B-side of the "Stupid Kid" single and was featured on the Another Year on the Streets Vol. 2 compilation album. It is a cover of Berlin's "The Metro."
Track 5 is from the compilation Atticus: ...dragging the lake.
Tracks 6-8 are from the Alkaline Trio/Hot Water Music Split CD. The song, "Rooftops" is a cover of the Hot Water Music song, which appeared on that band's No Division release.
Track 9 is a Good Mourning era track (also included as a bonus track on the UK version of the album) that originally appeared on the Thick Records compilation Oil: Chicago Punk Refined.
Track 10 is from the Rock Against Bush, Vol. 1 compilation album.
Tracks 11-16 are from the BYO Split Series, Vol. 5 EP with One Man Army. "Wait for the Blackout" originally performed by The Damned. "Sadie" was also included on Crimson.
Tracks 17-18 are B-sides from the "Time to Waste" single, produced by legendary punk producer Mass Giorgini.
Track 19 is a Crimson era B-side from the single "Mercy Me".

Scraps companion album
On Valentine's Day 2007, the band posted a bulletin on their MySpace giving a downloadable template and cipher.
When printed and aligned correctly with the booklet in the Remains album, the template gave a user name and a password.
When the cipher was deciphered, it gave a web address to go to.
This website contained a downloadable album and cover file.
The cipher and template accessible to Blood Pact members was different from those of the general public.

MySpace Scraps Tracks
 "Private Eye" (Acoustic) - 3:38
 "Crawl" (Acoustic) - 4:23
 "This Could Be Love" (Acoustic) - 4:15
 "Cringe" (Live) - 2:24
 "You've Got So Far to Go" (Live) - 2:58
 "Mr. Chainsaw" (Live) - 3:37
 "She Took Him to the Lake" (Live) - 2:32
 "Crawl" (BBC) - 4:27
 "Heaven" (BBC) - 3:35
 "Over at the Frankenstein Place" - 2:32 Total - 34:18
Blood Pact Scraps Tracks
 "Fine Without You" (Remix)
 "Burn" (Alleged Remix)
 "Prevent This Tragedy" (Live)
 "Warbrain" (Demo)

References

External links

Remains at YouTube (streamed copy where licensed)
Scraps companion album

Alkaline Trio albums
2007 compilation albums
Vagrant Records compilation albums
B-side compilation albums